Riley B. King (September 16, 1925 – May 14, 2015), known professionally as B.B. King, was an American blues singer-songwriter, guitarist, and record producer. He introduced a sophisticated style of soloing based on fluid string bending, shimmering vibrato, and staccato picking that influenced many later blues electric guitar players. AllMusic recognized King as "the single most important electric guitarist of the last half of the 20th century".

King was inducted into the Rock and Roll Hall of Fame in 1987 and is one of the most influential blues musicians of all time, earning the nickname "The King of the Blues", and is considered one of the "Three Kings of the Blues Guitar" (along with Albert King and Freddie King, none of whom are related). King performed tirelessly throughout his musical career, appearing on average at more than 200 concerts per year into his 70s. In 1956 alone, he appeared at 342 shows.

King was born on a cotton plantation of Berclair near the city of Itta Bena, Mississippi, and later worked at a cotton gin in Indianola, Mississippi. He was attracted to music and the guitar in church and began his career in juke joints and local radio. He later lived in Memphis and Chicago; then, as his fame grew, he toured the world extensively. King died at 89 in Las Vegas on May 14, 2015.

Early life 
Riley B. King was born on September 16, 1925, on a cotton plantation of Berclair named Bear Creek in Leflore County, near the city of Itta Bena, Mississippi, the son of sharecroppers Albert and Nora Ella King. When King was four years old, his mother left his father for another man, so he was raised by his maternal grandmother, Elnora Farr, in Kilmichael, Mississippi, then in Lexington. As a teen, he moved to Indianola, Mississippi which he referred to as his hometown and he later worked at a cotton gin. King served in the U.S. Army during World War II but was released after being ruled as “essential to the war economy” based on his experience as a tractor driver.

While young, King sang in the gospel choir at Elkhorn Baptist Church in Kilmichael. King was attracted to the Pentecostal Church of God in Christ because of its music. The local minister performed with a Sears Roebuck Silvertone guitar during services and taught King his first three chords. King's first guitar was bought for him by Flake Cartledge, his employer in Kilmichael, for 15 dollars. Cartledge withheld money from King's salary for the next two months until the debt was repaid.

In November 1941, King Biscuit Time first aired, broadcasting on KFFA in Helena, Arkansas. It was a radio show featuring the Mississippi Delta blues. King listened to it while on break at a plantation. A self-taught guitarist, he then wanted to become a radio musician.

In 1943, King left Kilmichael to work as a tractor driver and play guitar with the Famous St. John's Gospel Singers of Inverness, Mississippi, performing at area churches and on WGRM in Greenwood, Mississippi.

In 1946, King followed Bukka White to Memphis, Tennessee. White took him in for the next ten months. King returned shortly afterward to Mississippi, where he decided to prepare himself better for the next visit. Two years later, he returned to West Memphis, Arkansas in 1948. He performed on Sonny Boy Williamson's radio program on KWEM in West Memphis, where he began to develop an audience. King's appearances led to steady engagements at the Sixteenth Avenue Grill in West Memphis and later to a ten-minute spot on the Memphis radio station WDIA. The radio spot became so popular that it was expanded and became the Sepia Swing Club.

He worked at WDIA as a singer and disc jockey, where he was given the nickname "Beale Street Blues Boy", later shortened to "Blues Boy", and finally to "B.B." It was there that he first met T-Bone Walker. King said, "Once I'd heard him for the first time, I knew I'd have to have [an electric guitar] myself. 'Had' to have one, short of stealing!"

Career

1949–2005 

In the late 1940s and early 1950s, King was a part of the blues scene on Beale Street. "Beale Street was where it all started for me", King said. He performed with Bobby Bland, Johnny Ace, and Earl Forest in a group known as the Beale Streeters.

According to King and Joe Bihari, Ike Turner introduced King to the Bihari brothers while he was a talent scout at Modern Records. In 1949, King began recording songs under contract with Los Angeles-based RPM Records, a subsidiary of Modern. Many of King's early recordings were produced by Sam Phillips, who later founded Sun Records. Before his RPM contract, King had debuted on Bullet Records by issuing the single "Miss Martha King" (1949), which did not chart well. "My very first recordings [in 1949] were[sic] for a company out of Nashville called Bullet, the Bullet Record Transcription company," King recalled. "I had horns that very first session. I had Phineas Newborn on piano; his father played drums, and his brother, Calvin, played guitar with me. I had Tuff Green on bass, Ben Branch on tenor sax, his brother, Thomas, on trumpet, and a lady trombone player. The Newborn family were the house band at the famous Plantation Inn in West Memphis."

King assembled his band, the B.B. King Review, under the leadership of Millard Lee. The band initially consisted of Calvin Owens and Kenneth Sands (trumpet), Lawrence Burdin (alto saxophone), George Coleman (tenor saxophone), Floyd Newman (baritone saxophone), Millard Lee (piano), George Joyner (bass) and Earl Forest and Ted Curry (drums). Onzie Horne was a trained musician enlisted as an arranger to assist King with his compositions. By his admission, King could not play chords well and always relied on improvisation.

King's recording contract was followed by tours across the United States, with performances in major theatres in cities such as Washington, D.C., Chicago, Los Angeles, Detroit, and St. Louis, as well as numerous gigs in small clubs and juke joints of the southern United States. During one show in Twist, Arkansas, a brawl broke out between two men and caused a fire. He evacuated with the rest of the crowd but returned to retrieve his guitar. He said he later discovered that the two men were fighting over a woman named Lucille. He named the guitar Lucille as a reminder not to fight over women or run into any more burning buildings.

Following his first Billboard Rhythm and Blues charted number one, "3 O'Clock Blues" (February 1952), B.B. King became one of the most important names in R&B music in the 1950s, amassing an impressive list of hits including "You Know I Love You", "Woke Up This Morning", "Please Love Me", "When My Heart Beats Like a Hammer", "Whole Lotta Love", "You Upset Me Baby", "Every Day I Have the Blues", "Sneakin' Around", "Ten Long Years", "Bad Luck", "Sweet Little Angel", "On My Word of Honor", and "Please Accept My Love". This led to a significant increase in his weekly earnings, from about $85 to $2,500, with appearances at major venues such as the Howard Theater in Washington and the Apollo in New York, as well as touring the "Chitlin' Circuit". 1956 became a record-breaking year, with 342 concerts booked and three recording sessions. That same year he founded his own record label, Blues Boys Kingdom, with headquarters at Beale Street in Memphis. There, among other projects, he was a producer for artists such as Millard Lee and Levi Seabury. In 1962, King signed to ABC-Paramount Records, which was later absorbed into MCA Records (which itself was later absorbed into Geffen Records). In November 1964, King recorded the Live at the Regal album at the Regal Theater. King later said that Regal Live "is considered by some the best recording I've ever had ... that particular day in Chicago everything came together."

From the late 1960s, new manager Sid Seidenberg pushed King into a different type of venue as blues-rock performers like Eric Clapton (once a member of the Yardbirds, as well as Cream) and Paul Butterfield were popularizing an appreciation of blues music among white audiences. King gained further visibility among rock audiences as an opening act on the Rolling Stones' 1969 American Tour. He won a 1970 Grammy Award for his version of the song "The Thrill Is Gone", which was a hit on both the Pop and R&B charts. It also gained the number 183 spot in Rolling Stone magazine's 500 Greatest Songs of All Time.

King was inducted into the Blues Hall of Fame in 1980, the Rock and Roll Hall of Fame in 1987, and the National Rhythm & Blues Hall of Fame in 2014. In 2004, he was awarded the international Polar Music Prize, given to artists "in recognition of exceptional achievements in the creation and advancement of music."

From the 1980s to his death in 2015, he maintained a highly visible and active career, appearing on numerous television shows and sometimes performing 300 nights a year. In 1988, King reached a new generation of fans with the single "When Love Comes to Town", a collaborative effort between King and the Irish band U2 on their Rattle and Hum album. In December 1997, he performed in the Vatican's fifth annual Christmas concert and presented his trademark guitar "Lucille" to Pope John Paul II. In 1998, he appeared in The Blues Brothers 2000, playing the part of the lead singer of the Louisiana Gator Boys, along with Eric Clapton, Dr. John, Koko Taylor and Bo Diddley. In 2000, he and Clapton teamed up again to record Riding With the King, which won a Grammy Award for Best Traditional Blues Album.

Discussing where he took the Blues, from "dirt floor, smoke in the air" joints to grand concert halls, King said the Blues belonged everywhere beautiful music belonged. He successfully worked both sides of the commercial divide, with sophisticated recordings and "raw, raucous" live performances.

2006–2014 
In 2006, King went on a "farewell" world tour, although he remained active afterward. The tour was partly supported by Northern Irish guitarist, Gary Moore, with whom King had previously toured and recorded. It started in the United Kingdom and continued with performances at the Montreux Jazz Festival and in Zürich at the Blues at Sunset. During his show in Montreux at the Stravinski Hall, he jammed with Joe Sample, Randy Crawford, David Sanborn, Gladys Knight, Leela James, Andre Beeka, Earl Thomas, Stanley Clarke, John McLaughlin, Barbara Hendricks and George Duke.

In June 2006, King was present at a memorial of his first radio broadcast at the Three Deuces Building in Greenwood, Mississippi, where an official marker of the Mississippi Blues Trail was erected. The same month, a groundbreaking was held for a new museum, dedicated to King, in Indianola, Mississippi. The B.B. King Museum and Delta Interpretive Center opened on September 13, 2008.

In late October 2006, King recorded a concert album and video entitled B.B. King: Live at his B.B. King Blues Clubs in Nashville and Memphis. The video of the four-night production featured his regular B.B. King Blues Band and captured his show as he performed it nightly around the world. Released in 2008, they documented his first live performances in over a decade.

In 2007, King played at Eric Clapton's second Crossroads Guitar Festival and contributed the songs "Goin' Home", to Goin' Home: A Tribute to Fats Domino (with Ivan Neville's DumpstaPhunk) and "One Shoe Blues" to Sandra Boynton's children's album Blue Moo, accompanied by a pair of sock puppets in a music video for the song.

In the summer of 2008, King played at the Bonnaroo Music and Arts Festival in Manchester, Tennessee, where he was given a key to the city. Also in 2008, he was inducted into the Hollywood Bowl Hall of Fame.

King performed at the Mawazine festival in Rabat, Morocco on May 27, 2010. In June 2010, King performed at the Crossroads Guitar Festival with Robert Cray, Jimmie Vaughan, and Eric Clapton. He also contributed to Cyndi Lauper's album Memphis Blues, which was released on June 22, 2010.

In 2011, King played at the Glastonbury Music Festival, and in the Royal Albert Hall in London, where he recorded a concert video.

Rolling Stone ranked King at No. 6 on its 2011 list of the 100 greatest guitarists of all time.

On February 21, 2012, King was among the performers of "In Performance at the White House: Red, White and Blues," during which President Barack Obama sang part of "Sweet Home Chicago". King recorded for the debut album of rapper and producer Big K.R.I.T., who also hails from Mississippi. On July 5, 2012, King performed a concert at the Byblos International Festival in Lebanon.

On May 26, 2013, King appeared at the New Orleans Jazz Festival.

On October 3, 2014, after completing his live performance at the House of Blues in Chicago, a doctor diagnosed King with dehydration and exhaustion, and the eight remaining shows of his ongoing tour had to be canceled. King did not reschedule the shows, and the House of Blues show would be the last before his death in 2015.

Equipment 

B.B. King used equipment characteristic of the different periods he played in. He played guitars made by various manufacturers early in his career. He played a Fender Esquire on most of his recordings with RPM Records. Later, he was best known for playing variants of the Gibson ES-355.

In the September edition 1995 of Vintage Guitar magazine, early photos show him playing a Gibson ES-5 through a Fender tweed amp. In reference to the photo, B.B. King stated,
"Yes; the old Fender amplifiers were the best that were ever made, in my opinion. They had a good sound and they were durable; guys would throw them in the truck and they'd hold up. They had tubes, and they'd get real hot, but they just had a sound that is hard to put into words. The Fender Twin was great, but I have an old Lab Series amp that isn't being made anymore. I fell in love with it, because its sound is right between the old Fender amps that we used to have and the Fender Twin. It's what I’m using tonight."

He later moved on from the larger Gibson hollow-bodied instruments, which were prone to feedback when played at high volumes, to various semi-hollow models, beginning first with the ES-335 and then a deluxe version called the ES-355, which employed a stereo option. In 1980, Gibson Guitar Corporation launched the B.B. King Lucille model, an ES-355 with stereo options, a varitone selector, and fine tuners (neither of which were actually utilized by B.B.) and, at King's direct request, no f-holes to further reduce feedback. In 2005, Gibson made a special run of 80 Gibson Lucilles, referred to as the "80th Birthday Lucille", the first prototype of which was given as a birthday gift to King, and which he used thereafter.

King used a Lab Series L5 2×12" combo amplifier and used this amplifier for a long time. It was made by Norlin Industries for Gibson in the 1970s and 1980s. Other popular L5 users are Allan Holdsworth and Ty Tabor of King's X. The L5 has an onboard compressor, parametric equalization, and four inputs. King also used a Fender Twin Reverb.

He used his signature model strings "Gibson SEG-BBS B.B. King Signature Electric Guitar Strings" with gauges: 10–13–17p–32w–45w–54w and D'Andrea 351 MD SHL CX (medium 0.71mm, tortoiseshell, celluloid) picks.

B.B. King's Blues Club 

In 1991, Beale Street developer John Elkington recruited B.B. King to Memphis to open the original B.B. King's Blues Club, and in 1994, a second club was launched at Universal Citywalk in Los Angeles. A third club in New York City's Times Square opened in June 2000 but closed on April 29, 2018. Management is currently in the process of finding a new location in New York City. Two more clubs opened, at Foxwoods Casino in Connecticut in January 2002, and in Nashville in 2003. Another club opened in Orlando in 2007. A club in West Palm Beach opened in the fall of 2009 and an additional one, based in the Mirage Hotel, Las Vegas, opened in the winter of 2009.
Another opened in the New Orleans French Quarter in 2016.

Television and other appearances 
King made guest appearances in numerous popular television shows including: The Cosby Show, The Tonight Show Starring Johnny Carson, The Young and the Restless, General Hospital, The Fresh Prince of Bel-Air, Sesame Street, Married... with Children, Sanford and Son and Touched by an Angel.

In 2000, the children's show Between the Lions featured a singing character named "B.B. the King of Beasts", modeled on the real King.

B.B. King: The Life of Riley, a feature documentary about King narrated by Morgan Freeman and directed by Jon Brewer, was released on October 15, 2012.

King's performance at the 1969 Harlem Cultural Festival appears in the 2021 music documentary Summer of Soul.

Personal life 

King was married twice, to Martha Lee Denton, November 1946 to 1952, and to Sue Carol Hall, 1958 to 1966. The failure of both marriages has been attributed to the heavy demands made by King's 250 performances a year. It is reported that he fathered 15 children with several women. After his death, three more have come forward, claiming King as their father as well. Though neither of his marriages produced children, and biographer Charles Sawyer wrote that doctors found his sperm count too low to conceive children, King never disputed paternity of any of the 15 who claimed it, and by all accounts was generous in bankrolling college tuitions and establishing trust funds. In May 2016, the 11 surviving children initiated legal proceedings against King's appointed trustee over his estimated $30 million to $40 million estate. Several of them also went public with the allegation that King's business manager, LaVerne Toney, and his personal assistant, Myron Johnson, had fatally poisoned him. Autopsy results showed no evidence of poisoning. A defamation suit filed by Johnson against the accusing family members (including his own sister, Karen Williams) is pending. Other children have filed lawsuits targeting King's music estate, which remains in dispute.

King was an FAA-certified private pilot and learned to fly in 1963 at what was then Chicago Hammond Airport in Lansing, Illinois. He frequently flew to gigs, but in 1995 his insurance company and manager asked him to fly only with another certified pilot. As a result, he stopped flying around the age of 70.

King's favorite singer was Frank Sinatra. In his autobiography, he spoke about how he was a "Sinatra nut" and how he went to bed every night listening to Sinatra's classic album In the Wee Small Hours. During the 1960s, Sinatra had arranged for King to play at the main clubs in Las Vegas. He credited Sinatra for opening doors to black entertainers who were not given the chance to play in "white-dominated" venues.

Philanthropy and notable campaigns 
In September 1970, King recorded Live in Cook County Jail, during a time in which issues of race and class in the prison system were prominent in politics. King also co-founded the Foundation for the Advancement of Inmate Rehabilitation and Recreation, tying in his support for prisoners and interest in prison reform. In addition to prison reform, King also wanted to utilize prison performances as a way to preserve music and songs in a similar way that Alan Lomax did.

In 2002, King signed on as an official supporter of Little Kids Rock, a nonprofit organization that provides free musical instruments and instruction to children in underprivileged public schools throughout the United States. He sat on the organization's Honorary Board of Directors.

Diagnosed with diabetes in 1990, King was a high-profile spokesman in the fight against the disease. He appeared in several television commercials for OneTouch Ultra, a blood glucose monitoring device, beginning in the early 2000s. American Idol contestant Crystal Bowersox, who was diagnosed with diabetes at age six, would co-star with King in later commercials.

Death and funeral 
The last eight shows of King's 2014 tour were canceled because of health problems caused by complications from high blood pressure and diabetes. On May 14, 2015, at the age of 89, he died in his sleep from vascular dementia caused by a series of small strokes as a consequence of his type 2 diabetes. Two of his daughters alleged that King was deliberately poisoned by two associates trying to induce diabetic shock; an autopsy showed no evidence of such.

King's body was flown to Memphis on May 27, 2015. A funeral procession went down Beale Street, with a brass band marching in front of the hearse while playing "When the Saints Go Marching In". Thousands lined the streets to pay their last respects. His body was then driven down Route 61 to his hometown of Indianola, Mississippi. He was laid in repose at the B.B. King Museum and Delta Interpretive Center, in Indianola, for people to view his open casket. The funeral took place at the Bell Grove Missionary Baptist Church in Indianola, on May 30. He was buried at the B.B. King Museum.

Discography

Studio albums 

 Singin' the Blues (1957)
 The Blues (1958)
 B.B. King Wails (1959)
 King of the Blues (1960)
 Sings Spirituals (1960)
 The Great B.B. King (1960)
 My Kind of Blues (1961)
 Blues For Me (1961)
 Blues in My Heart (1962)
 Easy Listening Blues (1962)
 B.B. King (1963)
 Mr. Blues (1963)
 Confessin' the Blues (1966)
 Blues on Top of Blues (1968)
 Lucille (1968)
 Live & Well (1969)
 Completely Well (1969)
 Indianola Mississippi Seeds (1970)
 B.B. King in London (1971)
 L.A. Midnight (1972)
 Guess Who (1972)
 To Know You Is to Love You (1973)
 Lucille Talks Back (1975)
 King Size (1977)
 Midnight Believer (1978)
 Take It Home (1979)
 There Must Be a Better World Somewhere (1981)
 Love Me Tender (1982)
 Blues 'N' Jazz (1983)
 Six Silver Strings (1985)
 King of the Blues: 1989 (1988) 
 There Is Always One More Time (1991)
 Blues Summit (1993)
 Lucille & Friends (1995)
 Deuces Wild (1997)
 Blues on the Bayou (1998)
 Let the Good Times Roll (1999)
 Makin' Love Is Good for You (2000)
 Riding with the King (2000, with Eric Clapton)
 A Christmas Celebration of Hope (2001)
 Reflections (2003)
 B.B. King & Friends: 80 (2005)
 One Kind Favor (2008)

Accolades

Awards and nominations 
Years reflect the year in which the Grammy was awarded, for music released in the previous year.

Other awards

Additional honors 
 Honorary Doctorate of Humanities from Tougaloo College (1973)
 Honorary Doctor of Music by Yale University (1977)
 Inducted into the Blues Hall of Fame (1980)
 Honorary Doctorate of Music from Berklee College of Music (1985)
 Inducted into the Rock & Roll Hall of Fame (1987)
 Grammy Lifetime Achievement Award (1987)
 The National Medal of Arts (1990)
 The National Heritage Fellowship from the NEA (1991)

 The Kennedy Center Honors – given to recognize "the lifelong accomplishments and extraordinary talents of our nation's most prestigious artists" (1995)
 Grammy Hall of Fame Award for "The Thrill is Gone" – given to recordings that are at least 25 years old and that have "qualitative or historical significance" (1998)
 The Library of Congress awarded him the Living Legend Medal for his lifetime of contributions to America's diverse cultural heritage (2000)
 The Royal Swedish Academy of Music awarded him the Polar Music Prize for his "significant contributions to the blues" (2004)
 The Golden Plate Award of the American Academy of Achievement (2004)
 The Presidential Medal of Freedom awarded by President George W. Bush on December 15 (2006)
 An honorary doctorate in music by Brown University (2007)
 The keys to the city of Portland, Maine (2008)
 A Mississippi Blues Trail marker was added for King to commemorate his birthplace (2008)
 Time named King No. 3 on its list of the 10 best electric guitarists (2009)
 King was awarded the MMP Music Award and inducted into the MMP Hall of Fame by the Mississippi Music Project (2018)
 A Google Doodle celebrated what would have been King's 94th birthday (2019)
 A King Homecoming Festival is held in Indianola, Mississippi during the first week in June every year

See also 

 African Americans in Mississippi
 B.B. King's Bluesville
 Honorific nicknames in popular music
 List of nicknames of blues musicians

References

Further reading

External links 

 
 
 
 B.B. King interview on Guitar.com
 "Blues Legend B.B. King" episode from In Black America series, distributed by the American Archive of Public Broadcasting

 
 
1925 births
2015 deaths
20th-century African-American male singers
20th-century American guitarists
21st-century African-American male singers
African-American Christians
African-American guitarists
African-American male singer-songwriters
African-American rock musicians
American blues guitarists
American blues singer-songwriters
American gospel musicians
American male guitarists
American Protestants
American rhythm and blues musicians
American rock singers
American soul singers
American street performers
Blues musicians from Mississippi
Commandeurs of the Ordre des Arts et des Lettres
Crown Records artists
Custom Records artists
Deaths from dementia in Nevada
Deaths from diabetes
Deaths from vascular dementia
Electric blues musicians
Federal Records artists
Fellows of the American Academy of Arts and Sciences
Geffen Records artists
Gospel blues musicians
Grammy Award winners
Grammy Lifetime Achievement Award winners
Guitarists from Mississippi
Guitarists from Tennessee
Jammy Award winners
Kennedy Center honorees
Kent Records artists
Lead guitarists
MCA Records artists
Memphis blues musicians
Mississippi Blues Trail
Musicians from Memphis, Tennessee
National Heritage Fellowship winners
People from Indianola, Mississippi
People from Kilmichael, Mississippi
People from Leflore County, Mississippi
Presidential Medal of Freedom recipients
Rock and roll musicians
RPM Records (United States) artists
Singer-songwriters from Mississippi
Singer-songwriters from Tennessee
Soul-blues musicians
Sun Records artists
United States Army personnel of World War II
United States National Medal of Arts recipients
Virgin Records artists